The Capitol Years 1995–2007 (also released as The Best of the Capitol Years 1995–2007) is a greatest hits album by American alternative rock band The Dandy Warhols. It was released in the UK on July 19, 2010, and in the United States on August 24, 2010. It comprises their years with Capitol Records, before the band left the label and started their own, Beat the World. It also features one original composition, "This Is the Tide," for which three different music videos were produced.

Track listing

Release history

References

External links 
 The Capitol Years 1995–2007 at The Dandy Warhols' official website
 
 

The Dandy Warhols albums
2010 compilation albums